The Cape Nelson State Park, near Portland on Victoria's southwest coast is a  state park. Attractions include a  clifftop walk and a visit to the Cape Nelson lighthouse. The lighthouse was completed in 1884 and today offers accommodation in the Light Station Keepers Cottages. Part of the route of the Great South West Walk is located within the park.

Fauna include the Heath Mouse, Red-necked Wallaby and Echidna. The main vegetation types are listed as Soap Mallee, Heath and Wet Heath.

The Cape Nelson lighthouse featured in the 2010 romantic drama South Solitary. The film provides good coverage of the interior of the lighthouse, cottage features and the landscape.

See also

 Protected areas of Victoria
 Discovery Bay Coastal Park

References

State parks of Victoria (Australia)
Headlands of Victoria (Australia)
Parks of Barwon South West (region)